Lou Lombardo may refer to:
 Lou Lombardo (baseball)
 Lou Lombardo (filmmaker)